Nathacha Rigobert (born 7 October 1980) is a Mauritian beach volleyball player. As of 2012, she plays with Elodie Li Yuk Lo. The pair played in the 2012 Summer Olympics tournament and were eliminated in the group stage.

References

External links
 

1980 births
Living people
Mauritian beach volleyball players
Women's beach volleyball players
Beach volleyball players at the 2012 Summer Olympics
Olympic beach volleyball players of Mauritius
African Games gold medalists for Mauritius
African Games medalists in volleyball
Competitors at the 2011 All-Africa Games